Stadio Ettore Mannucci is an arena in Pontedera, Italy.  It is primarily used for football, and is the home to  club Pontedera. The stadium holds 5,014 spectators.

During the 2022–23 Serie C season, the stadium is also serving as the home venue of Monterosi.

References

Football venues in Italy